This is the list of villages in Sitamarhi district of Bihar, India

C.D.Block-wise list of census villages in Sitamarhi district, Bihar, India

Villages in Bairgania C.D.Block

Villages in Bajpatti C.D.Block

References 

Geography of Bihar